"Revolution" is a song by Swiss recording artist Stefanie Heinzmann. It was written by Alexandria Maillot, Amanda Maillot and Joby Baker for her debut album Masterplan (2008), while production was helmed by Marek Pompetzki and Paul NZA. Released as the album's third single, it reached the top fifty of the German Singles Chart.

Charts

Weekly charts

References

External links
  
 
 Lyrics of this song - Revolution

Songs about revolutions
2008 singles
2008 songs
Stefanie Heinzmann songs
Universal Music Group singles